Revenge for Love is a 2017 Chinese romantic comedy film directed by Chung Siu-hung and starring Yue Yunpeng, Yuan Shanshan and Sun Jian. It was released in China on 14 February 2017.

Plot
A boy had a crush on a girl, but was rejected big time in front of an audience. Many years later, the girl becomes a well known art designer, and the boy becomes a caretaker in a rehab. He befriends a billionaire for saving the old man's life. Backed by the billionaire to go after his love once again, but instead the man wants to get his revenge for the rejection that scared him all those years. He hires a company which specializes in match making, hoping that his dream girl would fall in love with him, so that he could take his turn rejecting her. As the story goes, old feelings come back and the man decides to abandon his plan. Before the man can come clean, his lies are discovered by the girl's ex, who wants to win her love back. With a regretted heart, despite the girl's disappointment in him, he convinces the billionaire to help the girl opening her own art exhibition. She finds out the truth, and finally realizes where her heart should be ...

Cast
Yue Yunpeng
Yuan Shanshan
Sun Jian
Ma Yuan
Shi Xiaoman
Tang Jingmei
Zhang Lei
Gu Zheng
Guo Degang
Allen Ai
Yang Neng
Pan Binlong

Reception
The film has grossed  in China.

References

Chinese romantic comedy films
2017 romantic comedy films
Huaxia Film Distribution films
Huayi Brothers films
Tianjin Maoyan Media films
2010s Mandarin-language films